Acianthera recurva is a species of orchid.

recurva